Ron Carey may refer to:

Ron Carey (actor) (1935–2007), American film and television actor who appeared in Barney Miller and in several films by Mel Brooks
Ron Carey (labor leader) (1936–2008), former president of the Teamsters union
Ron Carey (Minnesota politician), chairman of the Republican Party of Minnesota from 2005 to 2009

See also
Rod Carey (born 1971), American football coach
Ron Casey (disambiguation)